The year 1744 in science and technology involved some significant events.

Astronomy
 Great Comet of 1744, first sighted in 1743, remains visible until April (perihelion about March 1).

Cartography
 César-François Cassini de Thury publishes a new triangulated map of France.

Earth sciences
 Susanna Drury's illustrations of the Giant's Causeway in northern Ireland are engraved by François Vivares in London (1743–4), bringing the rock formation to wide European notice.

Mathematics
 Leonhard Euler discovers the catenoid and proves it to be a minimal surface.

Medicine
 By July – Northampton General Hospital established as Northampton Infirmary in England.

Awards
 Copley Medal: Henry Baker

Births
 March 7 - Jean-Baptiste Dumangin, French physician (died 1826)
 June 22 – Johann Christian Polycarp Erxleben, German naturalist (died 1777)
 August 1 – Jean-Baptiste Lamarck, French naturalist (died 1829)
 August 16 – Pierre Méchain, French astronomer (died 1804)
 October 17 – Andrew Duncan, Scottish physician (died 1828)

Deaths
 February 14 – John Hadley, English mathematician (born 1682)
 April 25 – Anders Celsius, Swedish astronomer and thermometrician (born 1701)
 July 1 – Catherine Jérémie, French-Canadian botanist (born 1644)
 October 4/5 – John Serson, English inventor (in wreck of )

References

 
18th century in science
1740s in science